Ottoman–Mamluk War may refer to:

 Ottoman–Mamluk War (1485–91)
 Ottoman–Mamluk War (1516–17)